The London Community Gospel Choir is Britain's first renowned contemporary "performance touring, inspirational gospel choir band", fusing gospel with multi-genres of music, including pop, soul, jazz, R&B, and classical. It was founded in 1982 and has gone on to provide backing for performers such as Justin Timberlake, Madonna, Gorillaz, and Kylie Minogue.

History
The London Community Gospel Choir was founded in 1982 by the Reverend Bazil Meade, with Lawrence Johnson, Delroy Powell, and John Francis. Francis would later go onto form The Inspirational Choir of the Pentecostal First Born Church of the Living God.

Initially, the idea was for a single concert, and this was staged by a 120-strong choir before an audience of more than a thousand people. The one-off event gave rise to a permanent choir, performing internationally for over 25 years.

The success of the first event led to enquiries for the choir to appear on television and radio and at various corporate functions across the United Kingdom and Europe. The choir debuted on television with a performance on Channel Four's Black on Black. In December 2003, The Guardian described the choir as "controversial, professional, energetic, inspiring and spirit-filled!"

The choir is known for its funk-flavoured gospel, swing-beat, rhythm and blues, traditional, and soulful arrangements, with lively choreography and vocal gymnastics.

Notable performances
 1992: joined George Michael's performance of Queen's "Somebody to Love" and "We Are the Champions" finale at The Freddie Mercury Tribute Concert.
 1994: joined Luther Vandross's performance of "Impossible Dream" at The Royal Albert Hall London, England on 13 September.
 1996: LCGC performed for the former South African president Nelson Mandela during his first visit to London in July 1996. The choir sang in August 2007 as a statue of Nelson Mandela was unveiled at a ceremony in Parliament Square, London.
 2005 backing Madonna's Live 8 performance of her single "Like a Prayer" in Hyde Park, London.
 2005–2006: LCGC performed "Don't Get Lost In Heaven" and "Demon Days" with Gorillaz at the Demon Days Live concert tour. 
 2009: performed the traditional hymn "Abide with Me" at Wembley Stadium to open the FA Cup final between Chelsea and Everton.
 2011: joined Eric Clapton at Hyde Park in 2011 on the song "Holy Mother".
 2012: joined Kylie Minogue at Hyde Park in 2012 on the song "Wow".
 2012: LCGC joined Blur to perform "Tender" at the 2012 Brit Awards. The choir also featured on the original song recording in 1999 and also in the music video.
 2016: performed in front of the Royal family at the Queen's 90th Birthday - Patron's Lunch at the Mall.
 2017: joined The 1975 at The Brit Awards to perform "The Sound".
 2018: joined Justin Timberlake at The Brit Awards to perform "Say Something".
 2019: joined The 1975 at The Brit Awards to perform "Sincerity Is Scary" and joined Pink to perform "Just Give Me a Reason".
 2022: auditioned for Britain's Got Talent and reached the semi-finals.

Recordings
The choir recorded a version of the OutKast song "Hey Ya!" with Razorlight (the B-side to their single "Vice"), featured on Will Young's debut album From Now On, and sang on Blur's hit, "Tender". They also provided backing vocals on Erasure's 1995 self-titled album, and throughout the Nick Cave and the Bad Seeds double album Abattoir Blues/The Lyre of Orpheus (2005). They also performed on the songs "Don't Get Lost in Heaven" and "Demon Days" on Gorillaz' Demon Days album. The choir has also recorded with Paul McCartney, Elton John, Westlife, Elkie Brooks, Tori Amos, Drumsound and Bassline Smith, Madonna, Paper Route, Dermot Kennedy, Gregory Porter, The 1975, and Brockhampton.

The choir recorded the backing track for "Circle of Life", as part of the original motion picture soundtrack to The Lion King, which went on to be nominated for the Best Original Song at the 1995 Academy Awards. They also made a guest vocal appearance on Billie Piper's hit song "Honey to the Bee".

The Edge of LCGC, a branch of the choir, released a limited-edition album, Keep Moving, as part of their yearly five-night residency at London's Jazz Café. The full version was released in Spring 2008.

In 2009, the choir recorded a charity single named "I Got Soul" for War Child. In October 2009, this single reached #10 in the UK Singles Chart, giving the London Community Gospel Choir its first top ten hit.

The choir featured on the Artists for Grenfell charity single "Bridge Over Troubled Water" in 2017.

Discography 

 Fill My Cup (1983)
 Feel the Spirit (1986)
 Gospel Greats (1990)
 Hush and Listen (1992)
 Live! Inspiration and Power (1996)
 Out of Many, One Voice (1998)
 Joy to the World (1999)
 Force Behind the Power (2001)
 Negro Spirituals and Gospel Songs (2002)
 Live at Abbey Road: 21st Anniversary Concert (2003)
 Keep Moving (Limited Edition) (2007)
 Glorious (2010)
 The Best of LCGC: Celebrating 30 Years (2012)
 Peace This Christmas (2014)

Bibliography
 Bazil Meade, with Jan Greenough, A Boy, a Journey, a Dream: The Story of Bazil Meade and the London Community Gospel Choir. London: Monarch Books, 2011.

Awards

1983: Oasis Gospel Music Awards - Choir of the Year
1985: Gospel Music Awards - Best Choir
1985: Gospel Music Awards - Best Record - Gospel Greats - LCGC
1986: The Greenbelt Festival Award for Services to Gospel Music - Rev. Bazil Meade
1985: The Commonwealth Institute Caribbean Focus Award
1994: The London Gospel Music Awards - Special Contribution to Music
1994/1995: Black Gospel Media Arts Network - UK Music Director of the Year
2002: Oasis Music Awards - Best British Choir
2002: Oasis Music Awards - Contribution to Gospel Music Special Award
2012: Urban Music Awards - Best Gospel Act
2017: MBE awarded to Bazil Meade for Services to Music, especially the development of British Gospel Music

External links 
 

British gospel music groups
London choirs
Rak Records artists
Musical groups established in 1982
1982 establishments in England